PMTS may refer to:
 Paramount Television Service
 Predetermined motion time system